Laurie Tisch (born 1951) is an American investor, philanthropist, and billionaire.

Biography
Tisch is the daughter of Joan (née Hyman) (1927–2017) and Preston Robert Tisch (1926–2005). Her father co-founded the Loews Corporation with his brother Laurence Tisch and was a 50% owner of the New York Giants football team. She and her two brothers (Jonathan Tisch and Steve Tisch) inherited her mother's 6% share in Loews after her death making them billionaires. Building upon her decades of leadership  in non profits and civic affairs, in 2007 She founded her charitable foundation, the Laurie M. Tisch Illumination Fund, with the core mission of increasing access and opportunity for all New Yorkers and fostering healthy and vibrant communities, using an equity lens to develop initiatives and to issue grants. Since she started the foundation, the Illumination Fund has undertaken high-impact initiatives, including Healthy Food & Community Change, launched in 2013, and Arts in Health, launched in 2018. Since its founding, the Illumination Fund has played a catalytic role in a range of initiatives and organizations, as well as in public-private partnerships with multiple City agencies.

In 2021, in response to increasing need for mental health resources brought on by the Covid-19 pandemic, the Illumination Fund issued an RFP inviting proposals from NYC-based arts and cultural organizations addressing mental health for people in historically marginalized and vulnerable communities. Projects must explore the role of arts as an approach to raise awareness of mental health challenges, promote healing, and foster creativity for people in these communities. Grants will be issued in early 2022.

Ms. Tisch is a former Co-Chair of the Board of Trustees at the Whitney Museum of American Art and is Vice Chair of the Board of Trustees at Lincoln Center for the Performing Arts, serves on the Board of Directors at The Juilliard School and The Jewish Communal Fund and is a Trustee of the Aspen Institute. She is also a co-owner and member of the Board of Directors of the New York Football Giants. Ms. Tisch is Chair Emeritus of the Center for Arts Education and the Children’s Museum of Manhattan (CMOM).

Ms. Tisch is a recipient of many awards for philanthropy and public service.  In December 2018, she received the Key to the City of New York at Gracie Mansion. She was named one of the “50 Most Powerful Women of 2017” by Crain’s New York Business, received a Lifetime Achievement Award from the New York Foundation for the Arts, and was honored with the United Way of NYC’s 10th Anniversary Power of Women to Make a Difference Award and by the New York Women’s Foundation. She received Share Our Strength’s “No Kid Hungry” Hero Award and New York City’s Special Merit in Public Health Award for her initiatives promoting access to healthy foods in low-income communities. She has also received the Lincoln Center Distinguished Service Award. She has an honorary doctorate from Yeshiva University.

She is divorced from Connecticut hedge fund manager Donald Sussman; they have two children including Carolyn Tisch Blodgett, a marketing strategist who served as Chief Marketing Officer at Peloton during their highest growth period, and Emily Tisch Sussman, a Democratic strategist, political commentator, and campaign coordinator who has run progressive campaigns for organizations such as the Center for American Progress and Swing Left.

References

1950s births
American billionaires
Jewish American philanthropists
Philanthropists from New York (state)
Laurie Tisch
Living people